The Abbasid invasion of Asia Minor in 806 was the largest of a long series of military operations launched by the Abbasid Caliphate against the Byzantine Empire. The expedition took place in southeastern and central Asia Minor, where the Abbasid and Byzantine empires shared a long land border.

Upon coming to the throne, the Byzantine emperor Nikephoros I ceased paying the tribute agreed to by his predecessors with the Caliphate, and launched attacks on the Abbasid frontier regions. The Abbasid caliph, Harun al-Rashid, who sought to promote himself as a champion of jihad, decided to lead in person a retaliatory attack with the objective of punishing the Byzantines and impressing Abbasid might upon their emperor.

Harun assembled his army at Raqqa in northern Syria. Medieval historians record numbers to be as high as 135,000 or even 300,000 men. While these are clearly exaggerated, it is clear that the Abbasid force assembled for the invasion was far larger than anything seen before. The Abbasid army set out from Raqqa on 11 June 806, crossed the coastal region of Cilicia and the Taurus Mountains, and invaded the Byzantine province of Cappadocia. The Abbasids met no opposition and raided at will, capturing several towns and fortresses. Celebrated in Arab histories was the siege, fall, and sack of the city of Herakleia; its name was later given to a victory monument erected by the Caliph near Raqqa. The Byzantine losses forced Nikephoros to seek peace terms in which he offered a resumption of tribute payments in exchange for the Abbasids' withdrawal. However, this time Harun exacted an additional personal tax levied on the Emperor and his son and heir, Staurakios, as a token of their submission to the Caliph.

Almost immediately following Harun's departure, Nikephoros violated the peace terms by refortifying the sacked frontier forts and stopping tribute payments. However, Harun's preoccupation with a rebellion in Khurasan, and his death three years later, prevented a reprisal on a similar scale to 806. Smaller-scale raids continued on both sides, but the Abbasid civil war, which began after 809, and the Byzantine preoccupation with the Bulgars contributed to a cessation of large-scale Arab–Byzantine conflict for the next two decades.

Background
The deposition of Byzantine empress Irene of Athens in October 802 and the accession of Nikephoros I in her place marked the start of a more violent phase in the long history of the Arab–Byzantine wars. Following a series of destructive annual raids into Byzantine Asia Minor by the Abbasid Caliphate, Irene apparently secured a truce with Caliph Harun al-Rashid in 798 in exchange for the annual payment of tribute, repeating the terms agreed for a three-year truce after Harun's first large-scale campaign into Asia Minor in 782. Nikephoros, on the other hand, was more warlike—a Syriac source records that when he learned of Nikephoros's accession, a Byzantine renegade warned the Abbasid governor of Upper Mesopotamia to "throw away his silk and put on his armour". In addition, the new emperor was determined to refill the treasury by, among other measures, ceasing the tribute.

In retaliation for the cessation of tribute and the violation of the peace agreement concluded with Irene, Harun launched a raid under his son al-Qasim in spring 803. Nikephoros could not respond to this, as he faced a large-scale revolt of the Byzantine army of Asia Minor under its commander-in-chief, Bardanes Tourkos. After disposing of Bardanes, Nikephoros assembled his army and marched out to meet a second, larger invasion under the Caliph in person. After Harun raided the frontier region, the two armies faced one another for two months in central Asia Minor, but it did not come to a battle: Nikephoros and Harun exchanged letters, until the Emperor arranged for a withdrawal and a truce for the remainder of the year in exchange for a one-off payment of tribute.

In the next year, 804, an Abbasid force under Ibrahim ibn Jibril crossed the Taurus Mountains into Asia Minor. Nikephoros set out to confront the Arabs, but was surprised and heavily defeated at the Battle of Krasos, where he barely escaped with his life. Preoccupied with trouble in Khurasan, whose governor, Ali ibn Isa ibn Mahan, had aroused the opposition of the local inhabitants, Harun once more accepted tribute and made peace. An exchange of prisoners was also arranged and took place during the winter at the border of the two empires on the Lamos in Cilicia: some 3700 Muslims were exchanged for the Byzantines taken captive in the previous years.

Harun then departed for Rayy to deal with the trouble in Khurasan, leaving al-Qasim to watch over the Byzantine frontier. In the spring of 805, Nikephoros used the opportunity to rebuild the destroyed walls of the towns of Safsaf, Thebasa, and Ancyra. In the summer of the same year, he launched the first Byzantine raid in two decades against the Arab frontier districts in Cilicia. The Byzantine army raided the territory surrounding the fortresses of Mopsuestia and Anazarbus and took prisoners as it went. The garrison of Mopsuestia attacked the Byzantine force and recovered most of the prisoners and spoils, but the Byzantines marched on to Tarsus, which had been refortified and repopulated on Harun's orders in 786 to strengthen the Muslim hold on Cilicia. The city fell and the entire garrison was taken captive.

At the same time, another Byzantine force raided the Upper Mesopotamian  and unsuccessfully besieged the fortress of Melitene, while a Byzantine-instigated rebellion against the local Arab garrison began in Cyprus, which for over a century had been an Arab–Byzantine condominium.

This sudden resumption of Byzantine offensive activity greatly alarmed Harun, especially as he received reports that Nikephoros was planning similar attacks for the next year, which this time would aim at the full reoccupation of these frontier territories. As the historian Warren Treadgold writes, if the Byzantines had been successful in this endeavour, "garrisoning Tarsus and Melitene would have partly blocked the main Arab invasion routes across the Taurus into the Byzantine heartland, to the Byzantines' great benefit". On the other hand, Nikephoros was certainly aware of the huge superiority of the Caliphate in men and resources, and it is more likely that he intended this campaign simply as a show of strength and a test of his enemy's resolve.

Campaign
Having settled matters in Khurasan by confirming Ibn Mahan in his governorship, Harun returned to the west in November 805 and prepared a huge retaliatory expedition for 806, drawing men from Syria, Palestine, Persia, and Egypt. According to al-Tabari, his army numbered 135,000 regular troops and additional volunteers and freebooters. These numbers are easily the largest ever recorded for the entire Abbasid era, and about half as many as the estimated strength of the entire Byzantine army. Although they—and the even more fantastic claims of the Byzantine chronicler Theophanes the Confessor of 300,000 men—are certainly exaggerated, they are nevertheless indicative of the size of the Abbasid force.  At the same time, a naval force under his admiral Humayd ibn Ma'yuf al-Hajuri was prepared to raid Cyprus.

The huge invasion army departed Harun's residence of Raqqa in northern Syria on 11 June 806, with the Caliph at its head. Al-Tabari reports that Harun put on a cap with the inscription "Warrior for the Faith and Pilgrim" (in Arabic, ", "). The Abbasids crossed Cilicia, where Harun ordered Tarsus to be rebuilt, and entered Byzantine Cappadocia through the Cilician Gates. Harun marched to Tyana, which at the time seems to have been abandoned. There, he began to establish his base of operations, ordering Uqbah ibn Ja'far al-Khuza'i to refortify the town and erect a mosque.

Harun's lieutenant Abdallah ibn Malik al-Khuza'i took Sideropalos. From there, Harun's cousin Dawud ibn Isa ibn Musa moved to pillage central Cappadocia, with half the Abbasid army—some 70,000 men according to al-Tabari. Another of Harun's generals, Sharahil ibn Ma'n ibn Za'ida, captured the so-called "Fortress of the Slavs" and the recently rebuilt town of Thebasa, while Yazid ibn Makhlad captured the "Fort of the Willow" and Malakopea. Andrasos was captured and Kyzistra was placed under siege, while raiders reached as far as Ancyra, which they did not capture.

Harun himself, with the other half of his forces, went west and captured the strongly fortified city of Herakleia after a month-long siege in August or September. The city was plundered and razed, and its inhabitants enslaved and deported to the Caliphate. The fall of Herakleia was considered by the Arab chroniclers the most significant achievement of Harun's expeditions against the Byzantines, and is the central event in the narratives of Harun's retaliatory campaign against Nikephoros. As the historian Marius Canard remarks, "for the Arabs the capture of Herakleia had an impact as profound as the Sack of Amorium in 838", which is completely at odds with the city's actual importance. Indeed, the Byzantine sources do not place any particular emphasis on the fall of Herakleia compared to the other fortresses captured during Harun's 806 campaign.

At the same time, on Cyprus, Humayd ravaged the island and took some 16,000 Cypriots, including the local archbishop, captive to Syria, where they were sold as slaves.

Nikephoros, outnumbered and threatened by the Bulgars in his rear, could not resist the Abbasid onslaught. He campaigned himself at the head of his army and seemingly won a few minor engagements against isolated detachments, but stayed well clear of the main Abbasid forces. In the end, with the harrowing possibility of the Arabs wintering on Byzantine soil in Tyana, he sent three clerics as ambassadors: Michael, the bishop of Synnada, Peter, the abbot of the monastery of Goulaion, and Gregory, the steward of the metropolis of Amastris. Harun agreed to peace in exchange for the payment of an annual tribute (30,000 gold nomismata, according to Theophanes, 50,000 according to al-Tabari), but the Emperor and his son and heir, Staurakios, were to pay a humiliating personal poll-tax of three gold coins each to the Caliph (four and two respectively, in Tabari's version), thereby acknowledging themselves as the Caliph's subjects. In addition, Nikephoros promised not to rebuild the dismantled forts. Harun then recalled his forces from their various sieges and evacuated Byzantine territory.

Aftermath

The agreement of peace terms was followed by a friendly exchange between the two rulers, related by al-Tabari: Nikephoros asked Harun for a young Byzantine woman, one of the candidate brides for his son Staurakios, who had been taken captive when Herakleia fell, and for some perfume. According to al-Tabari,

Nikephoros returned the favour by dispatching a horse laden with 50,000 silver coins, 100 satin garments, 200 garments of fine brocade, 12 falcons, four hunting dogs, and three more horses. But as soon as the Arabs had withdrawn, the Emperor again restored the frontier forts and thereafter ceased the payment of tribute. Theophanes records that Harun unexpectedly returned and seized Thebasa in retaliation, but this is not corroborated elsewhere.

The Arabs did launch a series of retaliatory raids in the next year, but the spring raid under Yazid ibn Makhlad al-Hubayri al-Fazari was soundly defeated, with Yazid himself falling in the field. The larger summer raid under Harthama ibn A'yan was met by Nikephoros in person, and after an indecisive battle both sides retreated. The Byzantines raided the region of Marash in return, while in late summer Humayd launched a major naval raid, which pillaged Rhodes and reached as far as the Peloponnese, where it may have fomented a rebellion among the local Slavs. On his return, however, Humayd lost several ships to a storm, and on the Peloponnese, the Slavic revolt was put down after failing to capture the city of Patras. The failure of the year's Abbasid efforts were compounded by the outbreak of Rafi ibn al-Layth's rebellion in Khurasan, which forced Harun to depart again for the East. The Caliph concluded a new truce, and another prisoner exchange was held at the Lamos in 808. Nikephoros was thus left with his gains, both the restored frontier fortifications and the cessation of tribute, intact.

Impact

Harun's massive expedition achieved remarkably little in material terms. Despite the sack of Herakleia, and its prominent treatment in Arab sources, no permanent result was achieved, as Nikephoros was quick to violate the terms of the truce. According to the historian Warren Treadgold, if Harun had taken the advice offered by one of his lieutenants to proceed further west and sack a major city, he might have inflicted more long-lasting damage on Byzantium, but the Caliph's objectives were more limited: Harun was content with a show of force that would intimidate Nikephoros and prevent him from repeating the offensive of 805, and which bolstered his credentials as a champion of Islam. In that regard, the Abbasid campaign was certainly a success: after 806, the Byzantine ruler abandoned whatever expansionist plans he may have had for the eastern border and focused his energy on his fiscal reforms, the recovery of the Balkans, and his wars there against the Bulgars, which would end with his death in the disastrous Battle of Pliska in 811.

On the other hand, the historian M. A. Shaban considers the campaign a "limited success" at best, and criticizes Harun's "single-minded" attention to the Byzantines as a "totally misguided effort". According to Shaban, not only did the Byzantines have no real ability (or intention) to seriously threaten the Caliphate, but Harun's recruitment drive led to the influx of eastern soldiers from Khurasan, which antagonized the traditional Syrian–Iraqi military elites and created rifts that contributed to the Fourth Fitna, the Abbasid civil war that broke out after Harun's death. This conflict, between Harun's sons al-Amin and al-Ma'mun, meant that the Abbasid Caliphate was not able to exploit the Byzantine reversals in the Balkans. Indeed, the 806 campaign and the ineffectual raids of 807 mark the last major, centrally organized, Abbasid expeditions against Byzantium for over twenty years. Isolated raids and counter-raids continued at land as well as at sea, and, independently of the Abbasids, local Muslim leaders conquered Crete and launched the conquest of Sicily in the 820s. Nevertheless, large-scale operations over the land border in eastern Asia Minor between the two empires resumed only after the accession of Emperor Theophilos, whose confrontations with the caliphs al-Ma'mun and al-Mu'tasim culminated in the great invasions by al-Ma'mun in 830–833, and the Sack of Amorium by al-Mu'tasim in 838.

The longest-lasting impact of Harun's campaign is found in literature. The Ottoman Turks also placed great importance on Harun's battles with the Byzantines. The account of the 17th-century Ottoman traveller Evliya Çelebi mixes the events of Harun's 782 campaign, when the Arab army had reached the Bosporus, with those of 806, as well as introducing clearly fictional elements such as the manner of Nikephoros' death. According to Evliya, Harun besieged Constantinople twice. The first time the Caliph withdrew, after securing as much land as an oxhide could cover and building a fortress there, in an imitation of the ancient tale of Queen Dido. The second time, Harun marched on Constantinople to avenge the massacre of Muslims living there, and ordered Nikephoros executed by hanging at the Hagia Sophia.

The main structure, built from stone taken from churches demolished on Harun's orders in 806–807, has four vaulted halls on the ground floor, and ramps leading to an upper storey, which was left incomplete on Harun's departure for Khurasan and subsequent death.

Notes

References

Bibliography
 
 
 
 
 
 
 
 
 
 
 
 
 
 
 

800s conflicts
800s in the Byzantine Empire
806
9th century in the Abbasid Caliphate
Abbasid–Byzantine wars
Byzantine Anatolia
Harun al-Rashid
Invasions by the Abbasid Caliphate
Military raids